Night of the Living Carrots is a 2011 American computer-animated short film produced by DreamWorks Animation and based on the film Monsters vs. Aliens. Following the 2009 short, Monsters vs. Aliens: Mutant Pumpkins from Outer Space, the short follows the monster team (minus Ginormica and Insectosaurus) taking on a mutated carrot army that can mind control others. Dr. Cockroach determines that the only way to defeat them and free their victims is for B.O.B. to eat all of the carrots.

The short originally premiered in two parts exclusively on the Nintendo Video video service for the Nintendo 3DS system; the first was released on October 13, 2011, and the second five days later. It eventually received a general release on August 28, 2012 as part of the Shrek's Thrilling Tales DVD and DreamWorks Spooky Stories Blu-ray.

Plot
In a theater, B.O.B. (Seth Rogen) introduces the story in a manner parodying typical horror films, with a recap of the events of "Mutant Pumpkins from Outer Space", and tells the audience to be prepared for a story guaranteed to give them nightmares.

The scene then shifts to the twist ending of the previous special. The Zombie Carrot charges at the camera, but is stopped by a gate slamming into it. Ginormica’s father, Carl (Jeffrey Tambor) announces to the children of the Modesto suburbs that a costume contest was starting and the winner would get their weight in candy. B.O.B., dressed as a pirate, takes all the candy. Outside, he's frightened by the zombie carrot, but mistakes it for a child in a costume. Believing the carrot would win the costume contest, he throws it inside where it immediately bites Carl, turning him into a zombie.

The guests flee the Murphy house and the carrot is blasted by Dr. Cockroach's (James Horan) scanner. Carl snaps out of his zombie state and Doc theorizes that the carrot was contaminated by the mutant pumpkins and the curse could only be lifted by eliminating the infected carrot. However, the remains of the carrot replicate themselves into more zombie carrots, reinfecting Carl. Against Cockroach's advice, B.O.B. uses the scanner to blast the carrots and before long, B.O.B., Cockroach and the Missing Link (David Kaye) are completely surrounded.

General Monger (Kiefer Sutherland) arrives but he falls victim to the zombie carrots. Cockroach, Link and B.O.B. retreat inside the house to create a barricade. B.O.B.'s bungling leads to Link getting infected and both Cockroach and B.O.B. retreat to Ginormica's old room, where a stray zombie carrot seemingly infects B.O.B.; this appears to have no effect however and Cockroach realizes that B.O.B. is immune because he has no brain. Cockroach then tells B.O.B. that the only way to save the day is that he must eat all the carrots.

This causes B.O.B. to have a flashback revealing why he has a fear of carrots; when he was young, he was force-fed carrot puree by General Monger. B.O.B. is unwilling to eat the carrots and escapes through the window to the roof, but when he sees his zombified friends, he decides to eat the zombie carrots.

B.O.B. eats every zombie carrot, rendering him obese. He is about to eat a "Nutty Buddy Butter Bar" for dessert when he sees his friends are still zombies. The original zombie carrot appears and B.O.B. is unable to pursue due to his weight. The carrot opens the bar, causing B.O.B. to chase it down and eat it whole as a chocolate-covered carrot. Link, Monger and Cockroach snap out of their zombie-like states and hug B.O.B. causing him to burp out an orange cloud.

Back in the theater, B.O.B. reminds us to eat our vegetables, or “they just might eat you", but his shadow morphs into a zombie carrot as he leaves.

Cast
 Seth Rogen as B.O.B.
 Kiefer Sutherland as General W.R. Monger
 James Horan as Dr. Cockroach
 David Kaye as the Missing Link
 Julie White as Wendy Murphy
 Jeffrey Tambor as Carl Murphy
 Bret Marnell as Zombie Carrot

References

External links

 
 

2011 animated films
2011 films
2010s American animated films
2010s animated short films
DreamWorks Animation animated short films
Films scored by Matthew Margeson
Zombie short films
Monsters vs. Aliens (franchise)
Science fiction television shows
2010s English-language films
American horror short films